Richard Alfred Mayela Páez Monzón known as Richard Páez (born 31 December 1953) is a Venezuelan football manager former coach of Deportivo Cuenca from Ecuador and of the Venezuela national football team.

Playing career

Club
Born in Mérida, Páez played club football for Estudiantes de Mérida, Portuguesa, Deportivo Táchira and Universidad de Los Andes.

International
He also played for the Venezuela national football team in the 1970s.

Managerial career
During his tenure, which lasted from January 2001 to November 2007, Venezuela achieved its best period in international football, improving from its status of being the worst team in South America. The squad reached the semi final of the 2007 Copa America, and also had several victories in FIFA World Cup qualifying.

In early 2008, he was signed as Alianza Lima's coach but was fired from his post a few months later.

In November 2011, Páez became the first Venezuelan football manager to win a competition outside of Venezuela when his team Millonarios won the Copa Postobón. In May 2012, he left Millonarios after one and one-half seasons in charge.

Personal life
His son, Ricardo Páez, was a member of the national team.

References

External links
ESPNSoccernet: Venezuela coach Paez quits over jeers

1952 births
Living people
Venezuelan footballers
Venezuela international footballers
Estudiantes de Mérida players
Portuguesa F.C. players
Deportivo Táchira F.C. players
Venezuelan football managers
Venezuela national football team managers
2001 Copa América managers
2004 Copa América managers
2007 Copa América managers
Deportivo Táchira F.C. managers
Club Alianza Lima managers
Millonarios F.C. managers
Mineros de Guayana managers
Association football midfielders
People from Mérida, Mérida
C.D. Cuenca managers
Estudiantes de Mérida managers